Strand is the second studio album by the American indie rock band The Spinanes, released in 1996 by Sub Pop.

Production
The album was recorded in Memphis, Tennessee. Elliott Smith sings on two tracks.

Release and promotion
Strand was released on February 27, 1996, by Sub Pop. To promote the album, the band performed with two additional musicians at Lounge Ax in Chicago, Illinois, on March 26, 1996.

Critical reception
AllMusic praised the album's variety of instruments and the addition of guest vocalists. The Washington Post wrote: "With Rebecca Gates adding piano, organ and mellotron to her guitar, such hushed, atmospheric tracks as 'Madding' and 'Luminous' live up to their Cocteau Twinnish titles." Magnet wrote that the album "transcended [the band's] ragged Northwest-indie roots and gave Gates’ smart songwriting a dreamy, atmospheric sheen." Trouser Press wrote that "the album exists on another plane, a dreamstate rooted in studio experimentation not live practicality."

Track listing
 "Madding" – 5:28
 "Azure" – 3:51
 "Lines and Lines" – 6:23
 "Meridian" – 3:53
 "Punch Line Loser" – 4:01
 "Valency" – 3:26
 "Luminous" – 6:03
 "Oceanwide" – 5:40
 "Winter On Ice" – 6:00
 "Watch Down" – 4:23
 "For No One Else" – 4:16

References

External links

1996 albums
The Spinanes albums
Sub Pop albums